Shilyagi (Kaitag and Dargwa: Шилагьи) is a rural locality (a selo) and the administrative centre of Shilyaginsky Selsoviet, Kaytagsky District, Republic of Dagestan, Russia. The population was 484 as of 2010. There are 19 streets.

Nationalities 
Dargins live there.

Geography
Shilyagi is located 9 km southwest of Madzhalis (the district's administrative centre) by road. Kulidzha and Khungiya are the nearest rural localities.

References 

Rural localities in Kaytagsky District